Gianluca Urbinati (born 27 September 1987) is an Italian professional footballer who plays as a midfielder for  club Pistoiese.

Club career
Urbinati started his career in Cattolica. He played on amateurs divisions in Italy.

On 13 July 2015 he joined Serie D club Fermana. Urbinati made his professional debut for Serie C, late on 27 August 2017 against Ravenna. He extended his contract in May 2019. He was named team captain.

On 29 August 2022, Urbinati moved to Pistoiese in Serie D.

References

External links
 
 

1987 births
People from Fano
Sportspeople from the Province of Pesaro and Urbino
Footballers from Marche
Living people
Italian footballers
Association football midfielders
Serie C players
Lega Pro Seconda Divisione players
Serie D players
Eccellenza players
Promozione players
A.S. Gubbio 1910 players
U.S. Pergolettese 1932 players
Alma Juventus Fano 1906 players
Vis Pesaro dal 1898 players
Fermana F.C. players
U.S. Pistoiese 1921 players